The stripe-headed sparrow (Peucaea ruficauda) is an American sparrow which breeds from Pacific coastal south-western Mexico, including the transverse ranges, Cordillera Neovolcanica to Pacific coastal northern Costa Rica.

Its habitat is brushy savannah, scrubby second growth and woodland edges, but it avoids the forest interior.

The nest, built by the female, is a deep cup of plant material lined with fine grass or horsehair. The female lays two to four unmarked pale blue eggs, which she incubates for 12–14 days. The whole group helps in feeding the chicks, and roost together in a tight group at night.

The adult has a black head with broad white stripes on the crown and above each eye. The nape is narrowly grey and the rest of the upperparts are pale brown, streaked with black on the back, but unstreaked and more buff on the rump and tail. The shoulders are rufous and the wing feathers have buff edging. The throat and underparts are white, becoming buff on the flanks and with a grey breast.

Young birds have a duller, indistinct head pattern, with buff stripes and a brown ground colour, and have streaked breasts.

There are four subspecies, which, in general, become larger and brighter from north to south. Thus the northernmost form, P. r. acuminata , is smaller than the nominate Costa Rican subspecies P. r. ruficauda, which has duller, browner upperparts, and paler, whiter underparts.

The stripe-headed sparrow has a group vocalisation of chattering squeaks. The male's song, given from an open perch, consists of dry thin notes, but shows geographical variation. The subspecies P. r. ruficauda has a dry trill, while P. r. acuminata has a series of pechew double notes.

The stripe-headed sparrow feeds on the ground mainly on grass seeds, but also takes some small insects and spiders. It is usually in family groups or small flocks of up to seven birds. The flight is low and fluttery, with the tail held low.

References

External links

 Photo; Article bafrenz.com
 
 
 
 

stripe-headed sparrow
Birds of Mexico
Birds of Central America
Birds of Guatemala
Birds of El Salvador
Birds of Honduras
Birds of Nicaragua
Birds of Costa Rica
stripe-headed sparrow
stripe-headed sparrow